A trunk deck ship is a type of merchant ship with a hull that was stepped inward in order to obtain more favourable treatment under canal toll rules then in effect. As those tolls were set by net tonnage, a measure of volume, and as the tonnage rules did not account for all of the cargo space of such vessels, trunk deck ships incurred lower tolls than more conventional ships of equivalent capacity. When the measurement rules were changed, the type was no longer built.

Background and design
Trunk deck ships were influenced by (and allegedly copied from) turret deck ships. In 1892, the Sunderland, England firm of William Doxford and Sons Ltd. built its first turret deck ship. Inspired by U.S. whalebacks, one of which had recently visited Liverpool, Doxford built a ship which had a curved hull form which was stepped in above the waterline. The narrow part of the hull, called a turret, was part of the hold.

Four years after the first turret deck ship, the first trunk deck ship appeared. SS Trunkby, completed in 1896, was built by Robert Ropner at his shipyard at Stockton-on-Tees. This vessel was of "three-island" construction with a forecastle, bridge house, and quarterdeck, extending to the full width of a low-freeboard hull. A distinctive feature was a long "trunk" along the centerline, with a breadth of about half the vessel's beam, which connected the three elements of the superstructure. This trunk was stepped inward from the sides of the hull. That trunk was not a deckhouse or superstructure, but was part of the hull, and contained cargo space.

In hull form, trunk ships resembled turret deck vessels, differing mainly in eliminating the curves and joining the above-water horizontal part of the hull with the vertical strakes and sides of the trunk by right angles. The similarity was such that Doxford, builder and operator of the turret decks, sued Ropners for patent infringement.

Advantages and disadvantages
As with turret deck ships, the design of the trunk deck ships was said to maximize strength while reducing the amount of steel needed for construction. Disadvantages included the narrow hatches atop the trunk, which inhibited efficient loading and unloading. The low freeboard meant smaller waves could board the ship, and the bridge and superstructure therefore had to be stronger to resist wave action.

Trunk deck ships had a low net tonnage (an approximate measure of cargo space) in comparison to their deadweight tonnage capacity (weight of cargo). Net tonnage is a computation of volume, and the method of measurement used at the Suez Canal to determine tolls was based on a measure of net tonnage which excluded the cargo spaces in the trunks of these unconventional hulls. Trunk deck ships therefore paid less in tolls. In 1911 the toll measure changed at Suez, and construction of the type ceased.

References

Notes

Sources
 
 
 
 
 
 . Google books has images of those pages, which contain the chapter entitled  Trunk Steamers. Retrieved 2008-03-26.
 .

Photographs
 Bow 3/4 and Stern 3/4 photographs of SS Trunkby from Old Ship Picture Galleries of www.photoship.co.uk; provenance unknown; location appears to be in River Avon (Bristol).

Ship types
Shipbuilding
Naval architecture